The Forbidden Fruit (romanized as Mive-ye mamnooe or Mive mamnooe) is an Iranian drama television series created for the channel IRIB TV2. It was filmed in Tehran, Iran. It was directed by Hassan Fathi and written by Alireza Kazemipour. It ran for one season of 30 episodes, which are sometimes grouped into 22 episodes when shown in reruns.

The plot centers on the disappearance and later murder of a company owner, Shayegan. His daughter Hasti, his creditor Jalal, and Jalal's family all become involved in the search for Shayegan and his killer.

It premiered on 3 December 2007. Episodes aired on weekdays at 6:00 PM. This program features a soundtrack that was composed and performed by Ehsan Khajeh Amiri. The ending theme was released as a single by Amiri.

Plot
A devoutly religious man of considerable age called Haj Younis is thrown into a whirlwind of emotions when he meets the young daughter of a man whose bankruptcy she blames on his son, Jalal. He finds himself fighting his heart to prove his long-lived faith, but inevitably falls prey to the restless desires the young girl incites in him.

Cast and characters
 Ali Nassirian as Haj Younis
 Amir Jafari as Jalal Younis
 Hanieh Tavassoli as Hasti
 Gohar Kheirandish as Ghodsi
 Nima Reisi as Mostafa
 Tannaz Tabatabaei as Gazal
 Ammar Tafti as Farzad
 Shabnam Farshadjoo as Samaneh
 Kianoosh Gerami as Shahram
 Sedigheh Kianfar as Aziz

References

External links

2000s Iranian television series
2007 Iranian television series debuts
2008 Iranian television series endings
Iranian television series
Islamic Republic of Iran Broadcasting original programming
Hindi-language television shows